Monster.com is a global employment website owned and operated by Monster Worldwide, Inc. It was created in 1999 through the merger of The Monster Board (TMB) and Online Career Centre (OCC). It is a subsidiary of Randstad Holding, a Dutch multinational human resource consulting firm, and is headquartered in Weston, Massachusetts. It is known for its "When I Grow Up" commercial for  Super Bowl XXXIII, which features kids telling about their future status of dead-end jobs.

History
Jeff Taylor contracted Christopher Caldwell of Net Daemons Associates to develop a facility in an NDA lab on a Sun Microsystems SPARCstation 5 where job seekers could search a job database with a web browser. The machine was moved to sit under a router in a phone closet in Adion (a human resources company owned by Taylor) when the site went live in April 1994.

Initially, the site was populated with job descriptions from the newspaper segment of Adion's business with the permission of the companies advertising the jobs.

Later, in 1996, The Monster Board issued a press release that was picked up and provided needed exposure to drive people to the website. Monster.com was the first public job search website on the Internet; the first public resume database in the world and the first to have job search agents or job alerts.

When TMP Worldwide acquired Adion, the site was moved into BBN Planet's web hosting facility where it grew from three SPARCserver 1000s to become the centerpiece of the globally distributed network it is today.

TMP went public in December 1996, with its shares traded on NASDAQ under the ticker symbol “TMPW”. In 1998, TMP acquisitions expanded the Recruitment Advertising network. TMP became one of the largest recruitment advertising agencies in the world.

In June 1998, The Monster Board moved its corporate headquarters out of a small office above a Chinese restaurant in downtown Framingham, Massachusetts, to an old textile mill in Maynard, Massachusetts, that formerly housed Digital Equipment Corporation.

In January 1999, The Monster Board became known as Monster.com after merging with Online Career Center, another of TMP Worldwide properties. The first post-merger president of the new Monster.com business was Bill Warren, the founder of Online Career Center.

In November 2000, seeking to attract additional job market levels, Monster bought JOBTRAK because it was used at thousands of heterogeneous college and university campuses.  The 1987 peaceful conception of JOBTRAK by Jeff Wohlwend who then brought in Dave Franey and the Ramberg family giving birth to what is now the MonsterTRAK feature "for male and female students and alumni seeking jobs and career advice."

Recognizing that job hunting often leads to relocation, Monster launched Monstermoving.com in 2000 to provide consumers with the comprehensive resources necessary for a successful move.

TMP Worldwide was added to S&P 500 Index in 2002. TMP Worldwide changed its corporate name to Monster Worldwide, Inc. and began trading under the new NASDAQ ticker symbol "MWW" in 2003.

Monster.com advertised on the Super Bowl starting in 1999 and every year through Super Bowl XXXVIII in 2004. Monster's first-ever Super Bowl ad, "When I Grow Up", (created by Mullen) asking job seekers, "What did you want to be?" It is the only commercial named to Time magazine's list of the "Best of Television 1999." As the official online career management services sponsor of the 2002 Olympic Winter Games and 2002 U.S. Olympic Team, Monster had a strong presence at the 2002 Olympic Winter Games in Salt Lake City.

On December 27, 2001, Yahoo! acquired HotJobs.com.

In April 2002, Monster purchased the Jobs.com URL and trademark for $800,000. Founder and Chairman Jeff Taylor were quoted as saying "Jobs.com is a desirable URL".

In August 2005, founder Jeff Taylor left Monster to create Eons.com.

In April 2007, Monster named Sal Iannuzzi as chairman and CEO.

In May 2007, Monster launched its first (NA and EU) Mobile services offering Mobile job search and career advice.

In January 2008, Monster acquired Affinity Labs for US$61 million.

In July 2008, Monster acquired Trovix, a semantic job search engine, for US$72.5 million.  Monster has indicated that it plans to replace its job search and candidate matching with Trovix's technology.

In February 2010, it was announced that Monster would acquire its rival, HotJobs, from Yahoo! for $225 million. HotJobs was shut down in favour of Monster.com, and Yahoo would establish a traffic-sharing agreement with Monster as well.

In 2011, with Iannuzzi still at the helm, the company's stock was rated the worst-performing stock of the year.

On 12 May 2012, after a 2-year drop in MWW's share price, Monster shares are up 20 percent, having rallied since CEO Sal Iannuzzi told an investor conference early in March 2012 that the company was considering "strategic alternatives." That bump, however, did not last.

On September 17, 2013, Monster.com launched a new feature allowing companies to include an "Apply with Monster" button on job listing pages.

February 2011: Monster vacated a location in Maynard, MA, and relocated an estimated 600 employees to Weston, MA. This ended a 15.5-year tenure in Maynard.

In July 20140 Monster reveals its new identity with a new logo, a new font and a stronger purple.

On November 4, 2014, Iannuzzi's tenure as CEO ended. During his time at the company's helm, its stock value declined by over 90% and it lost 93% of its market capitalization, falling from US$5.5bn when he was named CEO to under $400M when he departed. Shares of Monster.com jumped 12% in pre-market trading with the announcement of his departure.

On June 8, 2016, Monster.com announced its acquisition of San Francisco-based start-up Jobr, a job-finding app the company described as a Tinder (app) for jobs.

On August 9, 2016, Monster was acquired by Randstad Holding, a multinational human resources and recruitment specialist, for $429 million in cash. Following completion of the transaction, its shares were delisted from the NYSE, which was traded under the ticker symbol "MWW".

In November 2017, as a part of this alliance, Monster India will act as an interface among students, colleges and recruiters by empowering institutions approved with AICTE.  This comprises students from various streams: engineering and technology; applied arts and craft; hotel management and catering; management; pharmacy, and architecture and town planning.

Criticism
Monster has been to blame in several instances of personal information theft. In less than two weeks, in August 2007, Monster had numerous leaks that resulted in the loss of millions of customers' data to identity theft. 

Monster waited several days to announce this leak, a delay that drew heavy criticism. They subsequently announced new security measures to prevent this from happening again.

In January 2009, there was another large-scale leak at its UK based site monster.co.uk, in which demographic information of up to 4.5 million people was obtained by hackers.

Stock option grants backdating scandal
Backdating a stock option means retroactively setting the option's strike price to a day when the stock traded at a different price. A call (buy) option with a lower strike price is more valuable because it's less expensive to exercise, while the inverse is true for a put (sell) option. The practice is not necessarily illegal but must be disclosed to shareholders. In July 2006, the company said it might restate financial results for the year that ended December 31, 2005, and previous years to record additional noncash charges for stock-based compensation expenses relating to various stock option grants.

In September 2006, Monster suspended Myron Olesnyckyj pending the internal review irregular stock option grants. He had held the titles of senior vice president, general counsel, and secretary.

On October 9, 2006, Monster named William M. Pastore, 58, chief executive after Andrew J. McKelvey resigned his posts as chairman and chief executive. McKelvey retained his seat on the board as chairman emeritus. The company said on October 25 that it found pricing problems in a "substantial number" of its past option grants and, as a result, it expected to restate its results from 1997 through 2005.

On November 22, 2006, Monster terminated Myron Olesnyckyj, the company's lead lawyer, as part of its investigation into past stock-option grant practices. In a statement, the company said Olesnyckyj was terminated "for cause."

The U.S. Attorney's Office for the Southern District of New York issued a subpoena to the company over options backdating, and a special committee of company directors planned to complete its own investigation by the end of the year. The company delayed filing its earnings results for the second and third quarters for 2006. Second-quarter results were expected December 13. Third-quarter numbers were to be issued "as soon as practicable," according to a November 7 statement from the company.

In 2006, Monster Worldwide, Inc. received a notice from Nasdaq about a possible delisting of its shares due to the company's failure to file its third-quarter earnings report. The delisting did not happen.

See also 
 List of employment websites
 TMP Worldwide Advertising and Communications

References

External links
 
 

 
American companies established in 1999
Business services companies established in 1999
Internet properties established in 1999
Companies based in New York City
Companies formerly listed on the New York Stock Exchange
Employment websites in the United States
Online marketplaces of the United States
Professional networks
2016 mergers and acquisitions